The women's heptathlon at the 2022 World Athletics Championships was held at the Hayward Field in Eugene on 17 and 18 July 2022.

Records
Before the competition records were as follows:

Qualification standard
The standard to qualify automatically for entry was 6420 points.

Schedule
The event schedule, in local time (UTC−7), was as follows:

Results

100 metres hurdles 
The 100 metres hurdles event was started on 17 July at 10:35.

Wind:Heat 1: +1.4 m/s, Heat 2: +0.7 m/s

High jump 
The high jump event was started on 17 July at 13:25.

Shot put 
The shot put event took place on 17 July.

200 metres 
The 200 metres event was started on 17 July at 18:38.

Wind:Heat 1: +1.5 m/s, Heat 2: +1.4 m/s

Long jump 
The long jump event was started on 18 July at 09:35.

Javelin throw 
The javelin throw event took place on 18 July at 10:50.

800 metres 
The 800 metres event took place on 18 July at 19:00.

Final standings 
The final standings were as follows:

References

Heptathlon
Heptathlon at the World Athletics Championships